Sylvia Fernando (1904–1983) was a Sri Lankan educator and family planning advocate. She co-founded the Family Planning Association of Ceylon in 1953.

Sylvia Fernando was born to an elite family in Colombo, Ceylon in 1904. Her mother was a social worker and her father was an obstetrician and gynaecologist.

Fernando was a lead member of the All Ceylon Women's Conference.

Fernando met Swedish women's rights activist Elise Ottesen-Jensen in 1948. In 1954 they found an ally in Swedish ambassador Alva Myrdal and lobbied their governments to try a family planning project. In May 1958, Sweden agreed to provide $80,000 to distribute contraceptives in two communities in Ceylon.

References

Further reading
Huston, Perdita. "Sylvia Fernando (1904–1983)." Motherhood by Choice: Pioneers in Women's Health and Family Planning. NY: The Feminist Press, 1992. pp. 39–54
Linder, Doris H. Crusader for Sex Education: Elise Ottesen-Jensen (1886–1973) in Scandinavia and on the International Scene. Lanham, MD: University Press of America, 1996.
"Sylvia Fernando 1904–1983," in People [London]. Vol. 19, no. 1, 1992, p. 24.

1904 births
1983 deaths
Birth control activists
Sinhalese educators